This is a list of the saints of Ireland, which attempts to give an overview of saints from Ireland or venerated in Ireland. The vast majority of these saints lived during the 4th–10th centuries, the period of early Christian Ireland, when Celtic Christianity produced many missionaries to Great Britain and the European continent. For this reason, Ireland in a 19th-century  adage is described as "the land of saints and scholars".

Christianity was introduced into Ireland toward the end of the 4th century. The details of the introduction are obscure, though the strict ascetic nature of monasticism in Ireland is said to be derived from the practices of the Desert Fathers. Although there were some Christians in Ireland before Patrick, who was a native of Roman Britain, he played a significant role in its full Christianisation.

Some of the most well known saints are Saint Patrick, Colmcill, Brigid of Kildare and the Twelve Apostles of Ireland.

After 1000, the prerogative of naming saints was granted exclusively to Rome, after which fewer people were named saints. Those canonized in the modern era include Oliver Plunkett (d. 1681, canonized 1975 by Pope Paul VI)  and Charles of Mount Argus (d. 1893, canonized in 2007 by Pope Benedict XVI).

Early saints

Modern saints 
Modern saints include:
 Saint Charles of Mount Argus
 Saint Oliver Plunkett
 Saint Lawrence O' Toole
 Saint Malachy O' Moore

Beatified people

Blessed

 Blessed John, or Terrence, Carey
 Blessed Ralph Corby (Corbington) (1598-1644), professed priest, Jesuits, born in Ireland but included in the Martyrs of England and Wales
 Blessed John Grove (d. 1679), layman, born in Ireland but included in the Martyrs of England and Wales
 Blessed Tadhg (Thaddeus) Moriarty, bishop
 Blessed Christian O'Conarchy, Irish Cistercian abbot
 Blessed Columba Marmion, Benedictine priest
 Blessed Charles Meehan (Mahoney) (1640-1679), professed priest, Franciscan Friars Minor (Recollects), born in Ireland but included in the Martyrs of England and Wales
 Blessed Dermot O'Hurley, Archbishop of Cashel, and 16 Companions, martyrs
 Patrick O'Hely professed priest, Franciscan Friars Minor (Observants); bishop of Mayo
 Conn O'Rourke,  professed priest, Franciscan Friars Minor (Observants)
 Matthew Lambert, layman
 Robert Meyler, layman
 Edward Cheevers, layman
 Patrick Cavanagh, layman
 Margaret Ball, laywoman
 Maurice MacKenragaghty, priest
 Dominic Collins, professed religious, Jesuits
 Concobhar Ó Duibheannaigh, professed priest, Franciscan Friars Minor (Observants); bishop of Down and Connor
 Patrick O'Loughran, priest of the archdiocese of Armagh
 Francis Taylor, layman
 Peter Higgins, professed priest, Dominicans
 Terence O'Brien, professed priest, Dominicans; bishop of Emly
 John Kearney, professed priest, Franciscan Friars Minor (Observants)
 William Tirry, professed priest, Augustinians
 Blessed Edmund Ignatius Rice, founder of the Congregation of Christian Brothers and the Presentation Brothers
 Blessed John Roche (d. 1588), layman, born in Ireland but included in the Martyrs of England and Wales
 Blessed Patrick Salmon, companion-martyr of John Cornelius
 Blessed John Sullivan, professed priest, Jesuits

Venerable

 Venerable Mary Aikenhead, founder of the Religious Sisters of Charity
 Venerable Catherine McAuley, founder of the Sisters of Mercy
 Venerable Mary Angeline Teresa McCrory, founder, Carmelite Sisters for the Aged and Infirm; born in Ireland
 Venerable Nano Nagle, founder of the Presentation Sisters
 Venerable Patrick Peyton, professed priest, Congregation of Holy Cross; born in Ireland
 Venerable Edel Quinn, member, Legion of Mary, born in Ireland
 Venerable Matt Talbot, lay ascetic
Servants of God

Alphonsus (Alfie Lambe), Legion of Mary envoy to South America

Frank Duff, Legion of Mary founder

Mother Mary Kevin Kearney, Irish nun and foundress

Father Andrew Mullen, a young Irish priest buried at Daingean in Co. Offaly.

Robert Scurlock, lay man and martyr

Father Willie Doyle, Irish priest and army chaplain

Elizabeth Kearney, laywoman and martyr

Margaret of Cashel, laywoman and martyr

Archbishop Richard Creagh, martyr

Father Gelasius O'Cullenan, Cistercian abbot and martyr

Other Holy People

Little Nellie of holy God, an Irish child from Cork with a reputation for holiness.

Kathleen Kilbane, a 13 year old girl who is buried on Achill Island.

Mary Theresa Collins, a 16 year old Irish girl from Cork whose body was found incorrupt.

Declan O'Toole, Irish priest martyred in Africa

Colm O'Brien, an Irish priest from Waterford involved with the Focolare movement.

Watt Henry, a lay man buried in Roscommon

Egbert Kelly, a Christian Brother from Baltinglass who was martyred in Asia. 

Sister Margaret Mary Mahon, Irish nun buried at Donnybrook

Sister Clare Crockett, a young Irish nun killed in South America.

Father Patrick Power, a 25 year old Irish priest from Bantry who died in the US in the 19th century.

Mother Frances Mary Teresa Ball, an Irish nun and a member of the Sisters of Loreto

Sister Alice O' Sullivan, a member of the Daughters of Charity martyred in China

Archdeacon Bartolomew Cavanagh, the parish priest of Knock, Co. Mayo

John McGuinness, a lay man and a lawyer in Dublin who died in his forties with a reputation for holiness.

Tom Doyle, a member of the Legion of Mary who worked in the Morning Star Hostel for the homeless.

Father John (Jack) O'Brien, a young Irish Columban missionary who was martyred in Korea.

Christopher Roche, an Irish layman and martyr tortured to death in London on the scavengers daughter.

Father Thomas Aquinas of Jesus, Irish Carmelite martyr

Mother Margaret Alyward, foundress of the Holy Faith Sisters

Sister Cecilia Thackaberry, an Irish Presentation nun martyred in Africa.

See also
 Irish Catholic Martyrs
 List of Catholic saints
 List of Anglo-Saxon saints
 List of Cornish saints
 List of Welsh saints
 List of saints of Northumbria
 List of Breton saints
 List of saints of the Canary Islands

References

Sources

Further reading

External links

Ancient Order of Hibernians — complete list of Ireland's saints
Catholic Online — Irish saints

Ireland
 
 
Saints
Saints
Saints